Noel Baker (22 December 1933 – 20 November 2011) was an Australian rules footballer who played with Melbourne in the Victorian Football League (VFL).

Notes

External links 

1933 births
2011 deaths
Australian rules footballers from Victoria (Australia)
Melbourne Football Club players